Osprey Orielle Lake is the Founder and executive director of the Women's Earth and Climate Action Network (WECAN) International, working nationally and internationally with frontline, grassroots and Indigenous leaders, policy-makers, and diverse coalitions to build women's leadership, climate justice, resilient communities, and a just transition to a decentralized, democratized clean energy future. Osprey was the visionary behind the International Women's Earth and Climate Summit, which brought together 100 global women leaders to draft and implement a 'Women's Climate Action Agenda’. She also is honored to serve on the executive committee for the Global Alliance for the Rights of Nature, and has been a core organizer of various International Rights of Nature Tribunals. Her writing about climate justice, women in leadership and other topics have been featured in The Guardian, Common Dreams, Earth Island Journal, The Ecologist, OpenDemocracy and Ecowatch and other publications. She is the author of the book Uprisings for the Earth:Reconnecting Culture with Nature, which won the 2011 Nautilus Book Award.

References

American activists
American women artists